Radiative flux, also known as radiative flux density or radiation flux (or sometimes power flux density), is the amount of power radiated through a given area, in the form of photons or other elementary particles, typically measured in W/m2. It is used in astronomy to determine the magnitude and spectral class of a star and in meteorology to determine the intensity of the convection in the planetary boundary layer. Radiative flux also acts as a generalization of heat flux, which is equal to the radiative flux when restricted to the infrared spectrum.

When radiative flux is incident on a surface, it is often called irradiance. Flux emitted from a surface may be called radiant exitance or radiant emittance. The ratio of irradiance reflected to the irradiance received by a surface is called albedo.

Shortwave radiation flux
Shortwave flux is a result of specular and diffuse reflection of incident shortwave radiation by the underlying surface. This shortwave radiation, as solar radiation, can have a profound impact on certain biophysical processes of vegetation, such as canopy photosynthesis and land surface energy budgets, by being absorbed into the soil and canopies. As it is the main energy source of most weather phenomena, the solar shortwave radiation is used extensively in numerical weather prediction.

Longwave radiation flux
Longwave flux is a product of both downwelling infrared energy as well as emission by the underlying surface. The cooling associated with the divergence of longwave radiation is necessary for creating and sustaining lasting inversion layers close to the surface during polar night. Longwave radiation flux divergence also plays a role in the formation of fog.

SI radiometry units

See also
Spectral flux density
Flux

References

Physical quantities
Vector calculus